Wilhelm Höcker (29 June 1886 in Holzendorf, Mecklenburg-Schwerin – 15 November 1955 in Güstrow) was a German politician (SPD, SED) and former Minister-President of Mecklenburg.

Höcker was the oldest former Minister-President of East Germany from the formation of the GDR until 12 April 1966; he was succeeded by Karl Steinhoff.

1886 births
1955 deaths
People from Mecklenburgische Seenplatte (district)
People from the Grand Duchy of Mecklenburg-Schwerin
Social Democratic Party of Germany politicians
Socialist Unity Party of Germany politicians
Members of the Provisional Volkskammer
Members of the 1st Volkskammer
Ministers-President of Mecklenburg-Western Pomerania
Recipients of the Patriotic Order of Merit in silver